Charles Thomas Jaeger (April 17, 1875 – September 27, 1942) was a pitcher in Major League Baseball who played for the Detroit Tigers during the 1904 Detroit Tigers season.

External links

1875 births
1942 deaths
Major League Baseball pitchers
Detroit Tigers players
Rockford Red Sox players
Indianapolis Indians players
Minneapolis Millers (baseball) players
Peoria Distillers players
Evansville River Rats players
Clinton Infants players
Fort Wayne Billikens players
Cedar Rapids Rabbits players
Davenport Prodigals players
Keokuk Indians players
Ottumwa Packers players
Ottawa Indians players
Baseball players from Illinois
People from Ottawa, Illinois